The Wishing Ring Man is a 1919 American silent drama film produced by Vitagraph Studios and directed by David Smith. It was based on the novel by Margaret Widdemer, and stars Bessie Love, with J. Frank Glendon in the title role.

The film is presumed lost.

Plot 
Joy Havenith (Love) is kept away from other young people so that she can inspire her grandfather's poetry. She is unhappy with her situation, and believes the "wishing ring man" (Glendon) when he says that, if she wishes hard enough, she will get everything she wants.

When she is given the opportunity to go to the city, her grandfather refuses to let her go because she is not engaged. Joy claims to be engaged to the doctor, and the doctor is forced to play along.

Cast 
 Bessie Love as Joy Havenith
 J. Frank Glendon as Dr. John Hewitt, The Wishing Ring Man
 Jean Hathaway as Mrs. Hewitt
 Claire Du Brey as Gale Maddox
 Truman Van Dyke as Clarence Rutherford
 Willie Marks as Grandfather Havenith
 Alberta Lee as Grandmother Havenith
 Dorothy Hagan as Phyllis Harrington
 Colin Kenny as Allen Harrington

Release 
On its release, it was shown with various serials and shorts, including Terror of the Range, the Pathé/Harold Lloyd comedy Billy Blazes, Esq., Mutt and Jeff, or Outing Chester pictures.

Reception 
The film received positive reviews, and it was noted that Love wore seventeen different costumes throughout the film.

References

External links 

 
 
 
 Magic lantern slide

1919 drama films
1919 lost films
1919 films
American black-and-white films
Silent American drama films
American silent feature films
Films based on American novels
Films directed by David Smith (director)
Lost American films
Lost drama films
1910s American films
1910s English-language films